Yorke Highway is the main road from Adelaide to the southern parts of the Yorke Peninsula in South Australia. It runs from the northeast to the southwest of the peninsula. It branches off Copper Coast Highway after rounding the top of Gulf St Vincent, runs down the coast to Ardrossan then inland through Maitland to the Spencer Gulf coast at Hardwicke Bay then through Warooka to the south coast at Marion Bay and Stenhouse Bay on Investigator Strait.

The state government proposes to restructure the intersection at the north end of the Yorke Highway to provide a large roundabout instead of it being the terminating road at a tee-junction. The roundabout will permit road trains to operate between Port Wakefield and Ardrossan which had previously not been permitted due to limitations of that intersection. Subsidiary works will improve the Yorke Highway north of Ardrossan with a widened bridge, sealed shoulders and overtaking lanes.

Rex Minerals propose to realign the Yorke Highway and move the intersection with the St Vincent Highway closer to Pine Point as part of the construction of the Hillside mine. What is now the northern end of the St Vincent Highway would move to a new alignment closer to the coast, with the Yorke Highway turning inland at the southern (Pine Point Road) end of this diversion instead of near the northern end.

Major junctions

References

Highways in South Australia
Yorke Peninsula